USS Bronstein (FF-1037) was the lead ship of her class in the United States Navy. She was named in honor of Assistant Surgeon Ben Richard Bronstein, who was killed in action on 28 February 1942 when  was sunk by a German U-boat off Cape May, New Jersey.

Bronstein was commissioned on 16 June 1963 as DE-1037 under the command of Stanley Thomas Counts. She was decommissioned 13 December 1990 and struck from the Navy list on 4 October 1991.

Bronstein was disposed of through the Security Assistance Program as a foreign military sale on 12 November 1993. She was transferred to Mexico on 12 November 1993 where she serves as ARM Hermenegildo Galeana (F202).

References

External links

NavSource.org Bronstein

 

Bronstein-class frigates
Cold War frigates and destroyer escorts of the United States
Ships built in Bridge City, Louisiana
1962 ships
Bravo-class frigates
Frigates of Mexico